Pouch is a village and a former municipality in the district of Anhalt-Bitterfeld, in Saxony-Anhalt, Germany. Since 1 January 2010, it is part of the municipality Muldestausee. It is located at Lake Goitzsche, part of the man-made lakeland Neuseenland, and close to the city of Bitterfeld-Wolfen.

Pouch is known for the annual Sputnik spring break festival in June.

External links

References

Former municipalities in Saxony-Anhalt
Muldestausee